Cork City South-East was a parliamentary constituency represented in Dáil Éireann, the lower house of the Irish parliament or Oireachtas from 1969 to 1977. The constituency elected 3 deputies (Teachtaí Dála, commonly known in English as TDs) to the Dáil, on the system of proportional representation by means of the single transferable vote (PR-STV).

History 
The constituency was created under the Electoral (Amendment) Act 1969 for the 1969 general election to Dáil Éireann. The old Cork Borough constituency was divided into the new constituencies of Cork City North-West and Cork City South-East. It was abolished under the Electoral (Amendment) Act 1974, when the Cork City North West and Cork City South East constituencies were replaced by the new constituency of Cork City.

Boundaries 
The constituency comprised the southern part of Cork city and suburbs.

TDs

Elections

1973 general election

1969 general election

See also 
Dáil constituencies
Politics of the Republic of Ireland
Historic Dáil constituencies
Elections in the Republic of Ireland

References

External links 
Oireachtas Members Database

Dáil constituencies in the Republic of Ireland (historic)
Historic constituencies in County Cork
Politics of Cork (city)
1969 establishments in Ireland
1977 disestablishments in Ireland
Constituencies established in 1969
Constituencies disestablished in 1977